Christ Church, Peas Hill is a former Unitarian Church which was at the junction of Peas Hill Road and Raglan Street in Nottingham.

History

A Sunday School was established from High Pavement Chapel in the St Ann’s Well district in 1860. In 1863 the foundation stone was laid for a new church, on the corner of Peas Hill Road and Raglan Street in St Ann’s. The church opened on 16 June 1864 as a daughter church of High Pavement.

However, the church always struggled with debt, and even as late as 1927, High Pavement Chapel were working to raise money to clear the debt of the church.

Services in the church ceased after February 1932, but the Sunday School continued until 1935. The church has been demolished.

References

Churches in Nottingham
Churches completed in 1864
Unitarian chapels in England